Serge Vandercam (1924, in Copenhagen – 10 March 2005, in Wavre) was a Danish-born Belgian painter, photographer, sculptor and ceramist associated with the CoBrA group.

External links
Serge Vandercam bio
Serge Vandercam
COBRA Research Center

1924 births
2005 deaths
Belgian ceramists
Belgian photographers
Abstract painters
20th-century Belgian sculptors
20th-century ceramists
Danish emigrants to Belgium